"Show Me Colours" is a song recorded by German band Masterboy. It was released in October 1996, as the second single from their album, Colours. The song reached number 10 in Czech Republic and Finland. It was also a top 30 hit in Austria and Germany. On the Eurochart Hot 100, "Show Me Colours" peaked at number 75.

Critical reception
Music & Media wrote about the song: "This sneak preview from the upcoming album Colours promises high paced, high quality dance. The fast beats and exciting melodies whip the listener up into a frenzy. Don't expect any heavy club stuff, though. This is purely radio-oriented dance material."

Music video
The music video for "Show Me Colours" was directed by Jonathan Bate. Bate also directed the music videos for "Generation of Love" and "Land of Dreaming".

Track listings
 CD maxi  
 "Show Me Colours" (Radio Edit) - 3:33
 "Show Me Colours" (Maxi Mix) - 6:06
 "Show Me Colours" (B-Side Mix) - 6:19
				
 CD maxi - Remixes
 "Show Me Colours" (Good Friends Single Mix) - 3:48
 "Show Me Colours" (Good Friends Instrumental Mix) - 6:10
 "Show Me Colours" (Big Club Mix) - 6:15
 "Show Me Colours" (Good Friends Vocal Mix) - 6:10

Charts

References

1996 singles
Masterboy songs
1996 songs
Mercury Records singles
Music videos directed by Jonathan Bate